This is a list of places with "Heath" in their name:

United Kingdom
Albury Heath, a small village in Surrey, England
Appledore Heath, a place in Kent, England
Apse Heath, a hamlet on the Isle of Wight, England
Ardleigh Heath, a hamlet in Essex, England
Balsall Heath, an inner-city area of Birmingham, England
Becontree Heath, an area of the London Borough of Barking and Dagenham, England
Bexley Heath, a town in the London Borough of Bexley, England
Blakenall Heath, a neighbourhood in Walsall, West Midlands, England
Bracebridge Heath, a commuter village near Lincoln, Lincolnshire, England
Broadbridge Heath, a village in the Horsham district of West Sussex, England
Cambridge Heath, a place in the London Borough of Tower Hamlets
Chadwell Heath, an area in London, England 
Colney Heath, a village near St Albans, Hertfordshire, England
Cradley Heath, a town in the Black Country, England
Dunwich Heath, heathland in Suffolk managed by the National Trust
Fernhill Heath, a village in Worcestershire, England
Flackwell Heath, a village in the outskirts of High Wycombe, Buckinghamshire, England
Forest Heath, a local government district in Suffolk, England
Hampstead Heath, a park in London, England
Haywards Heath, a town in West Sussex, England
Heath, Cardiff, Wales
Heath, Derbyshire, England
Heath, Herefordshire, a hamlet
Heath, Shropshire, a civil parish
Heath Hayes, Staffordshire, England
Heath Row, another spelling of Heathrow, a small hamlet in Middlesex, England, demolished to make way for Heathrow Airport
Heathrow Airport, one of the main airports for London, England
Heath Town, a district of Wolverhampton, West Midlands, England
Hockley Heath, a village in the Metropolitan Borough of Solihull, West Midlands, England
Holt Heath, Worcestershire, a village in Worcestershire, England
Hopton Heath, a village in Shropshire, England
Kelling Heath, an area on the north Norfolk coast, England
Kings Heath, a suburb of Birmingham, England
Little Heath (disambiguation), one of several places in England
Locks Heath, a residential suburb of Fareham, Hampshire, England
Martlesham Heath, a village near Ipswich, Suffolk, England
Mousehold Heath, an area of heathland and woodland near Norwich, England
Newton Heath, a district in the city of Manchester, England
Northumberland Heath, a neighbourhood within the London Borough of Bexley
Penenden Heath, a suburb in the town of Maidstone in Kent, England
Rode Heath, a village in Cheshire, England
Row Heath, hamlet in Essex
Short Heath (disambiguation), one of several places
Small Heath, Birmingham, England
Stockton Heath, a village in Cheshire, England
Surrey Heath, a local government district in Surrey, England
Talbot Heath, a heath in Bournemouth, Dorset
Therfield Heath, a Nature Reserve near Therfield, Hertfordshire, England
Thornton Heath, a district in the London Borough of Croydon
Wall Heath, a village on the western fringe of the Black Country, England
Washwood Heath, an area of Birmingham, England
West Heath (disambiguation), one of several places in England
Whitacre Heath, a village in Warwickshire, England
Wrotham Heath, a small village in Kent, England

United States
Heath, Alabama
Heath Place, California
White Heath, Illinois
Heath, Indiana
Heath, Massachusetts
Heath, Ohio
Heath, Texas
Heath Township (disambiguation) (two townships)

Denmark
Heath, Kongenshus
Heath, Harrild

Elsewhere
Heath River, on the border between Peru and Bolivia
Lüneburg Heath (German: Lüneburger Heide), a region in Lower Saxony, Germany

See also
Blackheath (disambiguation), a number of places
Heath (disambiguation)
Heathfield (disambiguation), a number of places

Heath